Moyale is the name of at least one town and two woredas in Ethiopia:

 Moyale, the town on the border between Kenya and Ethiopia
 Moyale, Oromia (woreda)
 Moyale, Somali (woreda)